Amy Steel Pulitzer (born Alice Amy Steel; May 3, 1960) is an American film and television actress. She made her acting debut in the comedy film Fat Chance (1981) directed by Manuel Summers. She then gained recognition for her role as aspiring child psychologist Ginny in the Steve Miner-directed horror film Friday the 13th Part 2 (1981). She also had roles in the mystery April Fool's Day (1986), the slapstick Walk Like a Man (1987), the thriller Play Nice (1992), and the anthology Tales of Poe (2014).

Steel had lead roles in the science fiction television series The Powers of Matthew Star (1982–83) and the drama For Love and Honor (1983–84)—both series aired for one season. Outside of these leading roles, she had guest appearances in shows such as Family Ties (1982), The A-Team (1983), Quantum Leap (1990), Home Improvement (1994), American Gothic (1995), and Millennium (1997). Steel additionally acted in television films such as First Steps (1985) and What Ever Happened to Baby Jane? (1991).

In the early 2000s, she began a career as a family and marriage therapist. Her last acting credit  was Dr. Ginny Field in the fan film Jason Rising (2021)—reprising her Friday the 13th character in a voice role.

Career

Film 
Steel made her theatrical debut in Manuel Summers' comedy film Fat Chance (1981), in which she portrayed the supporting role of Allison. The same year, Steel obtained the lead role of Ginny Field in Steve Miner's slasher film Friday the 13th Part 2, a sequel to Friday the 13th (1980). She won the role through an audition, and it went on to become one of her most recognizable performances. Steel had two days of shooting in the daytime and the rest at night. The shoot was physically and mentally exhausting for the actress to the point of her stating: "I hope I never have to do another horror film the rest of my life." The film earned over $21 million ($71 million inflated) at the box office. Steel turned down a sequel offer due to her agent pushing her for higher-budgeted roles and being exhausted from the second film. Steel's next feature role was Kit in Fred Walton's hybrid black comedy mystery slasher film April Fool's Day (1986) which she described as a different shooting experience compared to Friday. Steel appeared as Penny in Melvin Frank's comedy Walk Like a Man (1987), opposite Howie Mandel. The film grossed $460k ($1 million inflated).

In 2014, Steel made her first acting appearance in 11 years in the anthology horror film Tales of Poe. She starred alongside Adrienne King and Caroline Williams. In 2021, Steel appeared as Dr. Ginny Field in the medium-length horror film Jason Rising: A Friday the 13th Fan Film — in a voice role cameo.

Television 
Steel began her career with guest roles on the CBS soap opera Guiding Light alongside fellow Friday the 13th star Kevin Bacon, as Trudy Wilson from 1980–1981, and as Peggy Warner on All My Children in 1980. In 1982, Steel had guest roles on the television series Seven Brides for Seven Brothers (1982) as Allison Freleng, Family Ties (1982) as Stephanie Brooks, CHiPs as Kelly Monahan, The A-Team (1983) as Kathy Ludlam, before being cast as Pam Elliott in the sci-fi series The Powers of Matthew Star alongside Peter Barton, who went on to appear in Friday the 13th: The Final Chapter. The series lasted until 1983. She was subsequently cast in the television films Women of San Quentin (1983) as Liz Larson and  First Steps (1985) as Nan Davis. From 1983–1984, Steel portrayed Sharon on the short lived television series For Love and Honor.

In 1985, she had a guest appearance in Stir Crazy as Lisa Grant. The following year, Steel was cast in the television thriller film The Red Spider. In 1987, and again in 1989, Steel a guest roles in Jake and the Fatman. In 1990, Steel guest starred on Father Dowling Mysteries and Quantum Leap before being cast as Connie in the television film What Ever Happened to Baby Jane?, a remake of the 1962 film of the same name. The same year, she guest starred on China Beach and Walter & Emily. In 1992, Steel was cast in the television film Perry Mason: The Case of the Reckless Romeo. The same year, she was cast in the horror film Play Nice.

In 1994, Steel guest starred on Viper, Home Improvement and Diagnosis: Murder before being cast in the television films Ray Alexander: A Taste for Justice and The Innocent. In 1995, she was cast in the television series The Commish and the television film Damaged and Deceived. In 1996, she guest starred on American Gothic and Chicago Hope. The following year, she portrayed Dr. Liz Michaels in an episode of Millennium. In 1999, Steel was cast in the films Valerie Flake and Tycus. The following year, she portrayed Commander Samantha Woodling in a guest appearance on JAG.

In 2003, Steel was cast as Claire Goodman Isenberg in the television film A Time to Remember. After this role, Steel took an extensive break from acting and became a psychotherapist.

Personal life 
During the filming of the 1985 television film First Steps, Steel developed a friendship with Nan Davis. In an interview, Steel said:
"We have a good relationship, we don't fret if we don't talk for a month. The filming ended last May, and we've seen each other two or three times since then. We get on the phone and it's as if we've not been out of touch at all."

Filmography

Film

Television

References

External links 
 
 

1960 births
Living people
Actresses from Pennsylvania
American film actresses
American soap opera actresses
American television actresses
21st-century American women